Echemus is a genus of ground spiders that was first described by Eugène Simon in 1878.

Species
 it contains twenty-two species:
Echemus angustifrons (Westring, 1861) (type) – Europe to Central Asia
Echemus a. balticus (Lohmander, 1942) – Sweden
Echemus chaetognathus (Thorell, 1887) – Myanmar
Echemus chaperi Simon, 1885 – India
Echemus chebanus (Thorell, 1897) – Myanmar
Echemus chialanus Thorell, 1897 – Myanmar
Echemus dilutus (L. Koch, 1873) – Australia (Queensland)
Echemus erutus Tucker, 1923 – South Africa
Echemus escalerai Simon, 1909 – Morocco
Echemus ghecuanus (Thorell, 1897) – Myanmar
Echemus hamipalpis (Kroneberg, 1875) – Uzbekistan
Echemus incinctus Simon, 1907 – West Africa
Echemus inermis Mello-Leitão, 1939 – Brazil
Echemus lacertosus Simon, 1907 – São Tomé and Príncipe
Echemus levyi Kovblyuk & Seyyar, 2009 – Turkey
Echemus modestus Kulczyński, 1899 – Madeira
Echemus orinus (Thorell, 1897) – Myanmar
Echemus pictus Kulczyński, 1911 – Indonesia (Java)
Echemus plapoensis (Thorell, 1897) – Myanmar
Echemus scutatus (Simon, 1880) – Algeria
Echemus sibiricus Marusik & Logunov, 1995 – Russia (South Siberia)
Echemus viveki Gajbe, 1989 – India

References

Araneomorphae genera
Gnaphosidae
Taxa named by Eugène Simon